Lecithocera myopa is a moth in the family Lecithoceridae. It was described by Edward Meyrick in 1913. It is found in South Africa.

The wingspan is 11–12 mm. The forewings are purplish grey, irrorated (sprinkled) with dark fuscous and blackish. There is a small whitish-ochreous spot at the base in the middle. The discal stigmata are cloudy and dark fuscous. The hindwings are rather dark grey.

References

Endemic moths of South Africa
Moths described in 1913
myopa